Ball & Welch Pty Ltd was a prominent department store in Melbourne, Australia from the 19th century through to the 1970s. In its heyday, the Ball & Welch department store was Melbourne's leading family draper, its A to Z departments including gloves, umbrellas and handkerchiefs, mantles, furniture, mercery, millinery, furs and corsets. At one time 26 assistants were devoted to the sale of lace alone.

History 
This drapery business was founded by Charles Ball (born  Frome, Somerset, England - 2 September 1876 Melbourne, Australia) and his nephew, William Henry Welch(born: and died:2 January 1896) in 1855. The company's first permanent store opened on the Goldfields at Forest Creek, at Vaughan Springs in 1861. In 1882, it moved to nearby Castlemaine.

In 1874 a branch was established in Melbourne in the suburb of Carlton. The large three-storied premises had frontages to Faraday, Drummond and University streets. The Carlton premises were subsequently used as a warehouse, the original building there partly was destroyed by fire in 1928.

An emporium at 180 Flinders Street was designed by architects Reed Smart & Tappin and was completed in 1899 in an American Romanesque style. The store was extended in 1911 with the purchase of the adjoining Commercial Travellers' Club. The store occupied around one third of the total block and stretched between Flinders Street and Flinders Lane. The Flinders Street store was one of the first in Melbourne to erect neon outdoor advertising, reportedly visible from the Dandenong Ranges.
A Sydney branch operated between 1913 and 1924.

In the midst of the Great Depression Ball & Welch contributed to the raising of funds used in 1931 to build a public art gallery in Castlemaine, before the Castlemaine store closed in 1941. 

Ball and Welch was listed on the Stock Exchange in 1935. The company was profitable for most of its history. In 1955, the company celebrated 100 years of trading with a commemorative booklet distributed through the Melbourne Herald on 19th March, 1955. 

In 1962 the company expanded and established a store in Frankston followed by Camberwell, and at Eastland (1966) and Southland (1968) shopping centres. It also operated a 'Ball & Welch gift store' at the then Melbourne Airport landside terminal in Essendon.

Demise 
In January 1970, Georges launched a successful takeover bid of Ball & Welch in a deal valued at $A1.48 million dollars, . The directors of Georges believed that Ball & Welch stores would give Georges a foothold in the suburbs.  Instead, Georges closed all of the Ball & Welch stores by 1976 selling the flagship Flinders Street store in May,1976

Stores today 
The Flinders Street store was renovated as Flinders Fair shopping centre in the late 1970s, its façade (including the Commercial Travellers' Club frontage) were eventually incorporated into the Flindersgate carpark. Flexible workspace operator, Hub Australia, opened a new coworking location in the historic Ball & Welch building in 2020. The honour roll from the Flinders Street store which commemorated the employees who served in World War One was relocated to  the  Light Horse & Field Artillery Museum at Nar Nar Goon, Victoria. The Frankston store is now a Savers store.

References

Defunct department stores of Australia
Defunct retail companies of Australia
Retail companies disestablished in 1976
1976 disestablishments in Australia
Companies based in Melbourne
Buildings and structures in Melbourne City Centre
History of Melbourne